Sharafkandi is a surname. Notable people with the surname include:

Abdurrahman Sharafkandi or Hajar, (Kurdish: Hejar, Persian: Hazhar) (1921–1991), Kurdish writer, poet, lexicographer, linguist, and translator
Sadegh Sharafkandi (Kurdish: Sadiq Şerefkendî) (1938–1992), Kurdish political activist